Kendrick-Baldwin House, also known as the Cass County Memorial Home, is a historic home located at Logansport, Cass County, Indiana. It was built in 1860, and is a -story, "T"-plan, Italianate style brick dwelling.  It has a two-story brick addition erected about 1922. It features a full-width, one-story front porch supported by Doric order limestone columns and added between 1920 and 1922, when the building was renovated for use as a veteran's home. The house was owned by Daniel P. Baldwin, who served as Indiana Attorney General from 1880-1882.

It was listed on the National Register of Historic Places in 1982.

References

Houses on the National Register of Historic Places in Indiana
Italianate architecture in Indiana
Houses completed in 1860
Houses in Cass County, Indiana
National Register of Historic Places in Cass County, Indiana
Logansport, Indiana